This is a list of serving generals of the Indian Army.

Chief of Defence  Staff

Chief of the Army Staff

Vice Chief of the Army Staff

Army Commanders (Commander-in-Chief Grade) 

**Rotational Command

Principal Staff Officers (PSO)

General Officers of Armed Forces Commands

Chiefs of Staff of Army Commands

Heads of Combat and Combat Support Arms

Heads of Services and Directorates

Commandants of Training Institutions

General Officers Commanding Corps

General Officers Commanding Areas

Other General Officers

See also
List of serving admirals of the Indian Navy
List of serving air marshals of the Indian Air Force

References

Indian military appointments
Lists of Indian military personnel
Indian Army appointments
Indian Army